The Francqui Prize is a prestigious Belgian scholarly and scientific prize named after Émile Francqui. Normally annually since 1933, the Francqui Foundation awards it in recognition of the achievements of a scholar or scientist, who at the start of the year still had to be under 50. It currently represents a sum of 250,000  Euros and is awarded in the following three-year rotation of subjects: exact sciences, social sciences or humanities, and biological or medical sciences.

Proposed candidates must be associated with a Belgian academic institution, in the case of a foreigner for at least ten years. The recipient is selected by a jury of eight to 14 members, none of whom may be associated with a Belgian institution. The members of the international jury vote by secret letter, and the laureate they recommend must be supported by two thirds of the assembled directors of the foundation (with a quorum of 12) or no prize would be awarded that year.

The prize is meant to encourage the further work of the young laureate, rather than crown the latter's career. Recipients are asked to organise an international colloquium in the appropriate discipline the same year that he is awarded the prize, which usually leads to an international publication which enables the quality of Belgian university research to be more widely appreciated.

Laureates of the Francqui Prize
 1933: Henri Pirenne
 1934: Georges Lemaître
 1936: Franz Cumont
 1938: Jacques Errera
 1940: Pierre Nolf
 1946: François-L. Ganshof
 1946: Frans-H. van den Dungen
 1946: Marcel Florkin
 1948: Léon H. Dupriez
 1948: Marc de Hemptinne
 1948: Zénon-M. Bacq
 1948: Pol Swings
 1948: Jean Brachet
 1949: Léon Rosenfeld
 1950: Paul Harsin
 1951: Henri Koch
 1952: Florent Bureau
 1953: Claire Preaux
 1953: Etienne Lamotte
 1954: Raymond Jeener
 1955: Ilya Prigogine (Nobel Prize Chemistry 1977)
 1956: Louis Remacle
 1957: Lucien Massart
 1958: Léon Van Hove
 1959: Gérard Garitte
 1960: Christian de Duve (Nobel Prize Medicine 1974)
 1961: Adolphe Van Tiggelen
 1961: Jules Duchesne
 1962: Chaïm Perelman
 1963: Hubert Chantrenne
 1964: Paul Ledoux
 1965: Roland Mortier
 1966: Henri G. Hers
 1967: José J. Fripiat
 1968: Jules Horrent
 1969: Isidoor Leusen
 1970: Radu Balescu
 1971: Georges Thines
 1972: Jean-Edouard Desmedt
 1973: Pierre Macq
 1974: Raoul van Caenegem
 1975: René Thomas
 1976: Walter Fiers
 1977: Jacques Taminiaux
 1978: Jacques Nihoul
 1979: Jozef Schell
 1980: Jozef IJsewijn
 1981: André Trouet
 1982: François Englert (Nobel Prize Physics 2013)
 1983: Alexis Jacquemin
 1984: Désiré Collen
 1985: Amand Lucas
 1986: Marc Wilmet
 1987: Jacques Urbain
 1988: Pierre van Moerbeke
 1989: Pierre Pestieau
 1990: Thierry Boon
 1991: Jean-Marie Andre
 1992: Géry van Outryve d'Ydewalle
 1993: Gilbert Vassart
 1994: Eric G. Derouane
 1995: Claude d'Aspremont Lynden
 1996: Etienne Pays
 1997: Jean-Luc Brédas
 1998: Mathias Dewatripont
 1999: Marc Parmentier
 2000: Marc Henneaux
 2000: Eric Remacle and Paul Magnette (Exceptional Francqui Prize for European Research)
 2001: Philippe Van Parijs
 2002: Peter Carmeliet
 2003: Michel Van Den Bergh
 2004: Marie-Claire Foblets
 2005: Dirk Inzé
 2006: Pierre Gaspard
 2007: François de Callataÿ
 2008: Michel A. J. Georges
 2009: Eric Lambin
 2010: François Maniquet
 2011: Pierre Vanderhaegen
 2012: Conny Aerts
 2013: Olivier De Schutter
 2014: Bart Lambrecht
 2015: Stefaan Vaes
 2016: Barbara Baert
 2017: Steven Laureys
 2018: Frank Verstraete
 2019: Laurens Cherchye, Bram De Rock and Frederic Vermeulen

See also 
 University Foundation
 Belgian American Educational Foundation (BAEF)
 List of general science and technology awards 
 List of social sciences awards

External links 
Francqui foundation
Laureates of the Francqui Prize 

Science and technology awards
Social sciences awards
Early career awards
Belgian awards
Awards established in 1933
1933 establishments in Belgium